In mathematics, particularly functional analysis, the Dunford–Schwartz theorem, named after Nelson Dunford and Jacob T. Schwartz, states that the averages of powers of certain norm-bounded operators on L1 converge in a suitable sense.

Statement of the theorem

 

The statement is no longer true when the boundedness condition is relaxed to even .

Notes 

Theorems in functional analysis